Ephraim–Gibraltar Airport  is a public use airport located one nautical mile (2 km) southwest of the central business district of Ephraim, a village in Door County, Wisconsin, United States. The airport is owned by the Village of Ephraim and the Town of Gibraltar. It was formerly known as Ephraim-Fish Creek Airport.

It is included in the Federal Aviation Administration (FAA) National Plan of Integrated Airport Systems for 2021–2025, in which it is categorized as a local general aviation facility.

History 
The first runway at the airport was graded in 1945.

Facilities and aircraft 
Ephraim–Gibraltar Airport covers an area of 239 acres (97 ha) at an elevation of 773 feet (236 m) above mean sea level. It has two runways: 14/32 is 2,697 by 60 feet (822 x 18 m) with an asphalt surface and 1/19 is 2,324 by 100 feet (708 x 30 m) with a turf surface.

Runway 1/19 slopes to the south such that one end of the runway can not be seen from the other.  The airport provides 100LL aircraft fuel.

For the 12-month period ending June 25, 2020, the airport had 9,300 aircraft operations, an average of 25 per day, with 59% transient general aviation, 38% local general aviation and 3% air taxi. In January 2023, there were 20 aircraft based at this airport: 17 single-engine, 1 multi-engine and 2 helicopter.

Climate

See also 
 List of airports in Wisconsin

References

External links 
 Friends of Ephraim-Gibraltar Airport
 

Airports in Wisconsin
Buildings and structures in Door County, Wisconsin
Transportation in Door County, Wisconsin